Niels Schibbye (14 July 1910 – 10 November 1989) was a Danish sailor. He competed in the 8 Metre event at the 1936 Summer Olympics.

References

External links
 

1910 births
1989 deaths
Danish male sailors (sport)
Olympic sailors of Denmark
Sailors at the 1936 Summer Olympics – 8 Metre
Place of birth missing